Humboldt County is a county in the U.S. state of Nevada. As of the 2020 Census, the population was 17,285. It is a largely rural county that is sparsely populated with the only major city being Winnemucca which has a population of 8,431. Humboldt County comprises the Winnemucca, NV Micropolitan Statistical Area and serves as an important crossroads in the national transportation network. Interstate 80 travels through the southeastern corner of the county, meeting US 95 in Winnemucca that serves as a primary freight corridor between Northern Nevada and Boise, Idaho and the Interstate 84 freight corridor that links much of the Pacific Northwest. The original transcontinental railway, constructed by the Central Pacific Railroad, reached Humboldt County on Sept. 16, 1868. The Western Pacific Railroad would reach Humboldt County by November 1909, providing two mainline rail links to California and the Eastern United States. Both railroads have since been acquired by the Union Pacific Railroad, who continues to serve the region today.

The county contains several areas of land belonging to regionally significant Native American communities including the Fort McDermitt Paiute and Shoshone Tribe and the Winnemucca Indian Colony of Nevada.

Largely a region with ranchers and farmers, the county came under increased attention after the 2017 proposal of the Thacker Pass Lithium Mine. The mine has been controversial locally and in the national press—as it would be the first major lithium clay mine to open in the United States and be important to the local economy but threatens local ecosystems and indigenous heritage sites.

History

Humboldt County is the oldest county in Nevada, created by the Utah Territorial Legislature in 1856. It was also one of Nevada's original nine counties created in 1861. The county is named after the Humboldt River, which was named by John C. Frémont, after Alexander von Humboldt, a German naturalist, traveler and statesman. Humboldt never saw the places that bear his name. Unionville was the first county seat in 1861 until the mining boom died there and it was moved to Winnemucca on the transcontinental railroad line in 1873.

The county was the site of an arrest in 2000 that led to the U.S. Supreme Court decision Hiibel v. Sixth Judicial District Court of Nevada in 2004.

Humboldt County is referenced in Brandon Flowers' 2015 song "Digging Up The Heart", in which the protagonist meets "Christie, queen of Humboldt County".

Geography

It is Nevada's fourth-largest county by area.

The Santa Rosa Range runs through eastern Humboldt County. The highest point in the county, 9,731-ft (2966 m) Granite Peak, is in the range. The most topographically prominent mountain in Humboldt County is unofficially known as Dan Dobbins Peak and is in the remote Jackson Mountains.

Adjacent counties
 Harney County, Oregon - northwest
 Malheur County, Oregon - north
 Owyhee County, Idaho - northeast/Mountain Time Border
 Elko County - east
 Lander County - southeast
 Pershing County - south 
 Washoe County - west

National protected areas
 Black Rock Desert-High Rock Canyon Emigrant Trails National Conservation Area (part)
 Humboldt National Forest (part)
 Sheldon National Wildlife Refuge (part)

Reservations 
The county includes land that is held by Indian reservations.

Fort McDermitt Paiute and Shoshone Tribe

Winnemucca Indian Colony of Nevada

Demographics

2000 census
At the 2000 census there were 16,106 people in the county, organized into 5733 households, and 4133 families.  The population density was 2 people per square mile (1/km2).  There were 6,954 housing units at an average density of 1 per square mile (0/km2).  The racial makeup of the county was 83.21% White, 4.02% Native American, 0.57% Asian, 0.51% Black or African American, 0.07% Pacific Islander, 8.54% from other races, and 3.09% from two or more races.  18.87%. were Hispanic or Latino of any race.

There were 5,733 households, 40.9% had children under the age of 18 living with them, 59.6% were married couples living together, 7.6% had a female householder with no husband present, and 27.9% were non-families. 22.8% of households were made up of individuals, and 6.3% had someone living alone who was 65 or older.  The average household size was 2.77 and the average family size was 3.28.

The age distribution was 31.40% under the age of 18, 7.50% from 18 to 24, 31.20% from 25 to 44, 22.30% from 45 to 64, and 7.50% who were 65 or older.  The median age was 33 years.  For every 100 females, there were 110.30 males.  For every 100 females age 18 and over, there were 110.20 males.

The median household income was $47,147 and the median family income was $52,156. Males had a median income of $44,694 versus $25,917 for females. The per capita income for the county was $19,539.  9.70% of the population and 7.70% of families were below the poverty line.  Out of the total population, 10.40% of those under the age of 18 and 10.80% of those 65 and older were living below the poverty line.

2010 census
At the 2010 census, there were 16,528 people, 6,289 households, and 4,316 families in the county. The racial makeup of the county was 79.0% white, 4.2% American Indian, 0.7% Asian, 0.5% black or African American, 0.1% Pacific islander, 12.7% from other races, and 2.8% from two or more races. Those of Hispanic or Latino origin made up 24.4% of the population. In terms of ancestry, 15.0% were English, 14.6% were Irish, 14.1% were German, and 5.1% were American.

Of the 6,289 households, 36.3% had children under the age of 18 living with them, 53.2% were married couples living together, 8.9% had a female householder with no husband present, 31.4% were non-families, and 25.6% of households were made up of individuals. The average household size was 2.60 and the average family size was 3.13. The median age was 36.2 years.

The median household income was $55,656 and the median family income was $69,032. Males had a median income of $56,843 versus $33,531 for females. The per capita income for the county was $25,965. About 7.8% of families and 12.0% of the population were below the poverty line, including 17.3% of those under age 18 and 4.6% of those age 65 or over.

Education

Humboldt County School District serves all of Humboldt County.

Previously Crane Union High School, a boarding high school in Oregon, served portions of the county, and it continues to be an option for residents living in Denio.

Law enforcement
There have been at least two allegations of abuse of civil forfeiture by Humboldt County Sheriff's deputy Lee Dove. Both cases were won by the civilians in question, albeit at great personal expense.

Politics

Economy

Lithium mine

Transportation

Major highways 

  Interstate 80
  Interstate 80 Business Loop
  U.S. Route 95
  State Route 140
  State Route 289
  State Route 290
  State Route 292
  State Route 293
  State Route 294
  State Route 789
  State Route 794
  State Route 795
  State Route 796

Communities

City
 Winnemucca (county seat)

Census-designated places
Denio
Fort McDermitt
Golconda
McDermitt
Orovada
Paradise Valley
Valmy

Unincorporated communities
Rebel Creek
Stone House
Tule

See also
 National Register of Historic Places listings in Humboldt County, Nevada

References

External links

 

 
1856 establishments in Utah Territory
Populated places established in 1856
Micropolitan areas of Nevada
Alexander von Humboldt